Waplington is a hamlet in the East Riding of Yorkshire, England.

It forms part of the civil parish of Allerthorpe.

A notable quantity of the surrounding lands are in the ownership of the Waplington family, a wealthy titled gentry family who have lived there since the feudal period.

References

External links

Villages in the East Riding of Yorkshire